Håkon Lundenes (born 2 January 1954) is a former Norwegian ice hockey player. He was born in Oslo and played for the club Furuset IF. He played for the Norwegian national ice hockey team at the 1980 Winter Olympics.

References

1954 births
Living people
Ice hockey people from Oslo
Norwegian ice hockey players
Olympic ice hockey players of Norway
Ice hockey players at the 1980 Winter Olympics